F. Andrieu (possibly François or Franciscus Andrieu) was a French composer in the  style of late medieval music. Nothing is known for certain about him except that he wrote Armes, amours/O flour des flours (Weapons, loves/O flower of flowers), a double ballade déploration, for the death of Guillaume de Machaut in 1377. The work has been widely praised and analyzed; it is notable for being one of two extant medieval double ballades for four voices, the only known contemporary musical setting of Eustache Deschamps and the earliest representative of the longstanding medieval and Renaissance lamentation tradition between composers. He may be the same person as Magister Franciscus, although the scholarly consensus on this identification is unclear.

Identity and career
Nothing is known for certain about Andrieu except his authorship of the double ballade for four voices: Armes, amours/O flour des flours (Weapons, loves/O flower of flowers), a déploration for the death of poet-composer Guillaume de Machaut (–1377), the most significant composer of the 14th century. The work is adapted from two texts by a student of Machaut, the poet Eustache Deschamps, making Andrieu's work the only surviving contemporary musical settings of over 1,500 lyrics by Deschamps. Musicologist Gilbert Reaney notes that this would mean that, from what is known about Andrieu, he is a "pure musician". The work is contained in the Chantilly Codex from the Musée Condé. While historian Gaston Raynaud dates the text between April to 28 May 1377, Andrieu may have set it to music anytime from then up until 15 years later (the Chantilly Codex was likely assembled sometime during 1393 to 1395).

Andrieu's association with Machaut's death in 1377 suggests he was French and flourished in the late 14th century. The "F." most likely stands for either "François" or "Franciscus". References to "F. Andrieu" outside of the Chantilly Codex are absent from other manuscript sources, leading to speculation that he is the composer Magister Franciscus, who wrote two ballades also present in the Chantilly Codex: De Narcissus and Phiton, Phiton, beste tres venimeuse. The scholarly consensus on the certainty of this identification is unclear. Reaney notes that Magister Franciscus's works are likely earlier than Andrieu's, between 1370 and 1376. Musicologist Guillaume de Van proposed that the Chantilly Codex was created for use in music schools; because of this, stylistic similarities to Machaut, and the lack of additional records on Andrieu, musicologist Robert Magnan suggested Andrieu was a student or teacher, utilizing Machaut's style to honor his master.

Music

Overview

Andrieu's only surviving work is the double ballade déploration for four voices: Armes, amours/O flour des flours, although Reaney notes that "this work alone, however, makes him of considerable interest". Written for Machaut's death, Andrieu's style is understandably similar to his, with musicologist Gustave Reese noting that the work shows the "vigorous survival" of Machaut's influence. Andrieu's work is one of two extant four-part double ballades of medieval music, the other being Quant Theseus/Ne quier veoir (B 34) by Machaut. A polyphonic double ballade is a fitting homage for Machaut, since he is credited as the genre's originator. As a double ballade, Armes, amours/O flour des flours has two texts sung simultaneously between the cantus voices, Cantus I beginning with "Armes, amours" and Cantus II with "O flour des flours". The work's four part division—two cantus (with text), contratenor, and tenor (without text)—was an older style and atypical of the usual three part—cantus (with text), contratenor and tenor (without text)—structure that dominated the 14th-century ballade repertory. Andrieu's decision for more traditional vocal parts may be a reflection of Deschamps's text, which is written in a "classicized high poetic style".

It is also the earliest surviving déploration for a fellow composer; the tradition was popular in medieval and Renaissance music. Later examples included Johannes Ockeghem's Mort, tu as navré de ton dart (1460) for Gilles Binchois; Josquin des Prez's Nymphes des bois (1497) for Ockeghem; and William Byrd's Ye Sacred Muses (1585) for Thomas Tallis. While the Chantilly Codex is a primary source of  music, with P. des Molins, Jehan Vaillant and Grimace, Andrieu is part of the "post-Machaut" generation whose pieces retain enough  qualities to be differentiated from those of the rhythmically-complex  composers such as Johannes Cuvelier and Johannes Susay.

Musicologist Eric Rice identifies two common characteristics in the text of typical déplorations: the "planctus" (from ) and the "discourse". The "planctus" refers to an involuntary sudden outburst of emotion, while the "discourse" is a calmer and clearer expression of grief. Deschamps's text contains both recurring and nonrecurring "planctus" exclamations. , from the second strophe, is a "planctus" exclamation that is nonrecurring; Rice considers this a "stereotyped exclamation of grief".

Refrain

The text of Deschamps's two ballades share a refrain: "La mort Machaut, le noble retorique". Musicologist Elizabeth Randell Upton notes that the "shared refrain receives the most striking coordination of the ballades' voices". Rice considers the refrain a reoccurring "planctus" since it appears at the end of each strophe; ballades were typically in aabC form – where C is always the same. Andrieu signifies the "planctus" by setting the words "La mort" and "Machaut" in long notes but followed by rests. By inserting rests, Andrieu disrupts the music and signifies the sudden outburst of emotion that characterizes a "planctus". The practice of using "planctus" during the refrain was abandoned by future composers who used more formal structures such as the cantus firmus.

Andrieu's musical setting of the refrain also highlights the name of the dedicatee (Machaut), by giving all four voices the same rhythm for the first four syllables ("La mort Machaut"). Such an effect gives the phrase a "striking and singular four-voice effect". The following bars give the lower voices subsidiary supporting roles, sustaining the dominance of the texted upper voices. This is assisted by the refrain's repetition, which naturally emphasizes Machaut's name. The designation of "le noble retorique" ("the noble rhetorician") is invented by Deschamps in order to give Machaut a formal title.

Similarities to other works

The Chantilly Codex contains six works – four ballades and two motets – that include their dedicatee's name directly. The dedicatee's proper name is mentioned in all four of these ballades, making them the only ballades of the 14th-century to do so. Two of these – Armes, amours/O flour des flours and Jacob Senleches's Fuions de ci, fuions povre campaigne for Eleanor of Aragon, Queen of Castile – lament their subject's death. Both works have the word "retorique" embellished by a melisma on the "ri" for six double whole notes. While Senleches includes himself as part of larger group of mourners, Deschamps names himself directly in the third stanza by stating "Ce vous requiert le bayli de Valois" ("This asks of you the Baliff of Valois"). Nevertheless, Deschamps also includes an invitation to a large group of mourners:

Musicologist Elizabeth Eva Leach notes that the Armes, amours/O flour des flours has both textual and musical similarities to Machaut's poetry and music respectively. In the refrain, Andrieu's work imitates a passage from the Gloria  of Machaut's Messe de Nostre Dame. It also shows a resemblance to Machaut's ballade De Fortune (B23); both works have "the same tonal emphases" and "similar tenor notes at key structure points". In Andrieu's work, the shared theme appears when the two cantus voices engage in musical imitation, something which was uncommon at the time.

Interpretation
Leach notes that the work has been "widely discussed by literary and musical scholars alike". According to Leach, the existence of this déploration suggests there was "interest in [Machaut's] own posterity... in the short term at least". Some scholars say this remembrance of Machaut mainly concerned his poetry and suggest that Deschamps did not intend Armes, amours/O flour des flours to be set to music. Magnan argues that Deschamps recognized termed musique artificiele (vocal and instrument performance) and musique naturele (poetry alone) as equally enjoyable. Furthermore, the fact that no other of Deschamps's poems have survived with music indicate that this one would not be any different. Leach disagrees, saying that it being the earliest known musical lamentation for a fellow composer recognizes his "poet-composer" status, as do the words "faysaur" (maker) and "retorique" (rhetorician). The work calls on "those who hold dear the sweet art of music" to mourn Machaut's death, suggesting his musical importance.

According to Leach, the line "Your name will be a precious relic" is contradictory to the traditional Platonism of the time: it dismisses the Platonic idea that a name is only a representation of someone, by suggesting Machaut's name alone is a "relic" and all encompassing to his being.

Works

Editions
Andrieu's work is included in the following collections:

Recordings
F. Andrieu's Armes, amours/O flour des flours is included in the following albums:

References

Notes

Citations

Sources
Books

 
 
 
 
 
 
 
 

Journals and articles

Further reading

External links
 Complete text of Armes, amours/O flour des flours (archived) from the Centre for Medieval Studies at the University of Exeter
 
 
 Works by F. Andrieu in the Medieval Music Database from La Trobe University

French classical composers
French male classical composers
14th-century French composers
Medieval male composers
Ars nova composers
Year of birth unknown
Year of death unknown